On 23 December 1983, the Le Grand Véfour restaurant in Paris was damaged in a bomb attack, in which twelve people were wounded. The attack in one of Paris's most exclusive restaurants left a large crater in its front. Five of the injured diners were Americans, and two were Japanese.

Raymond Oliver, owner of Le Grand Véfour, was quoted by his daughter as saying, "I am ruined. My clients trust me and this had to happen to me as I reach the end of my career."

Nobody claimed responsibility for the attack. The Action Directe terror group also denied involvement, saying it did not carry any political significance. The case file was closed by police and no one has been apprehended.

See also
Chez Jo Goldenberg restaurant attack

References

1983 crimes in France
1983 in Paris
1980s crimes in Paris
Attacks on buildings and structures in Paris
Attacks on restaurants in Europe
December 1983 crimes
December 1983 events in Europe
Improvised explosive device bombings in 1983
Improvised explosive device bombings in Paris
Terrorist incidents by unknown perpetrators
Terrorist incidents in France in 1983
Unsolved crimes in France
Building bombings in France